Ronald Stuart Burt (born 1949) is an American sociologist. He is the Charles M. Harper Leadership Professor of Sociology and Strategy at the University of Chicago Booth School of Business and a Distinguished Professor at Bocconi University.  He is most notable for his research and writing on social networks and social capital, particularly the concept of structural holes in a social network.

Biography
Originally a pre-medical major, Burt earned his B.A. in social and behavioral sciences from Johns Hopkins University in 1971 with a focus on social psychology. He earned a M.A. in Sociology from The State University of New York at Albany in 1973 working with Nan Lin. He moved to the University of Chicago to work with mathematical sociology professor James Samuel Coleman and earned his Ph.D. in Sociology in 1977. His dissertation committee also included the social network analyst Edward Laumann.

Prior to joining the University of Chicago in 1993, he was a professor of sociology at the University of California, Berkeley and Columbia University. He is also the former Shell Professor of Human Resources at INSEAD and has held various organizational development positions at Raytheon.

He currently resides in the Milan metropolitan area.

Research
He is the author of several books on sociology, organization behavior and network analysis, including Structural Holes: The Social Structure of Competition (Harvard University Press, 1992) and Brokerage and Closure: An Introduction to Social Capital (Oxford University Press, 2005)  His research has been published in numerous academic journals, including Administrative Science Quarterly, American Journal of Sociology, Academy of Management Journal, Organization Science, Social Networks, Sociological Inquiry, and others.

Publications

Books

Highly-cited articles

References

External links
 Personal website
 University of Chicago homepage
 Bocconi University Homepage

1949 births
Living people
People from Chicago
Johns Hopkins University alumni
University at Albany, SUNY alumni
University of Chicago alumni
American sociologists
Network scientists
University of Chicago faculty
Columbia University faculty
Fellows of the American Academy of Arts and Sciences